Jason Rebrovich (born March 15, 1978) is an American football coach who is the pass rush specialist for the Green Bay Packers of the National Football League (NFL). He also spent time coaching the Buffalo Bills and Jacksonville Jaguars.

Coaching experience

SUNY Cortland
Rebrovich began coaching at his alma mater of Cortland State from 2001 to 2003, serving as its defensive line and strength coach.

Concord University
He then served as the defensive line coach and head strength and conditioning coach at Concord University in 2004.

Ferris State
He then served as the defensive line coach and head strength and conditioning coach at Ferris State University from 2005 to 2007.

SUNY Cortland (second stint)
Rebrovich returned to Cortland in 2008 as its defensive coordinator, as well as its special teams coordinator and head strength and conditioning coach. He stayed there through the 2010 season.

Syracuse
Rebrovich became the defensive quality control coach for Syracuse University for the 2011 and 2012 seasons.

Buffalo Bills
In 2013, he followed then Syracuse head coach Doug Marrone to the Buffalo Bills where he became a defensive quality control coach. Rebrovich was promoted to assistant defensive line coach before the 2014 season. He was promoted to outside linebackers coach before the 2015 season. He was promoted to defensive line coach before the 2016 season.

Jacksonville Jaguars
In 2017, he began working with the Jacksonville Jaguars as assistant defensive line coach. He was promoted to defensive line coach on January 16, 2019. He missed the team's week 11 game in 2020 against the Pittsburgh Steelers due to COVID-19 pandemic protocols.

Green Bay Packers
On February 18, 2022, Rebrovich was hired by the Green Bay Packers as their outside linebackers coach. On March 10, 2023, Rebrovich was promoted to pass rush specialist.

Personal life
Rebrovich is a native of Clarence, New York, and graduated from Clarence High School in 1996. He played two years of college football at Alfred State College, before finishing his collegiate football career at Cortland.

References

External links
 Green Bay Packers bio

Living people
Buffalo Bills coaches
Jacksonville Jaguars coaches
People from Clarence, New York
Green Bay Packers coaches
1978 births